The men's high jump event at the 1975 Summer Universiade was held at the Stadio Olimpico in Rome on 21 September.

Results

References

Athletics at the 1975 Summer Universiade
1975